Vicente de Carvalho Station is an integrated Rio de Janeiro Metro subway and BRT bus station that services the neighbourhood of Vicente de Carvalho in the North Zone of Rio de Janeiro.

Services
The station is serviced by the TransCarioca bus line on the BRT network and Line 2 on the Rio de Janeiro Metro.

References

Metrô Rio stations
Railway stations opened in 1996
1996 establishments in Brazil
TransCarioca